The Israeli Women's National Softball Team is the national team of the Israel. It is governed by the Israel Softball Association.

Israel Softball announced in 2019 that they were to build a "Dream Team" in order to try to qualify for the Olympics. That year they placed 9th in the European Championship.  

In 2020, they announced they were going to continue their run with coaches Corey Vyner, of Israel Softball, and Nikki Palmer, Head Coach of California Riverside.

Results
European Championships

Notable players 
Tamara Statman Schoen

References

External links
 Official National Federation website
 International Softball Federation

Softball
Women's national softball teams
Softball in Israel